The 1888–89 season was Bolton Wanderers's first season in the Football League which had just been founded. Because of this they became one of the founder members of the Football League. They finished in 5th position with 22 points.

Final league table

Results

Bolton's score comes first

Legend

Football League

FA Cup

Appearances
 Note: Bolton used their reserves in the FA Cup.

See also
1888–89 in English football
List of Bolton Wanderers F.C. seasons

References

Bolton Wanderers F.C. seasons
Bolton